Dichomeris amphicosma is a moth in the family Gelechiidae. It was described by Edward Meyrick in 1930. It is found in Pará, Brazil.

The forewings are blue grey with a moderate blackish-fuscous fascia, mostly deep ferruginous on the costal half, posteriorly edged whitish, rounded angulated in the middle, anteriorly with two projections in the disc. There is a small round black whitish-edged spot in the middle of the disc, and a larger one beneath this, where a ferruginous line runs along the dorsum to the tornus. There is also a transverse blackish-fuscous whitish-edged blotch in the disc beyond the middle, the upper half filled with ferruginous. There is also a triangular blackish patch resting on the termen from the apex to the tornus, whitish edged except above, its angle touching the upper end of the preceding blotch. There is some slight whitish suffusion on the costa towards the apex. The hindwings are grey, the tornus suffused with blackish- grey.

References

Moths described in 1930
amphicosma